Abdullahi Shelleng (born 20 January 1942) was the first Military Governor of Benue State, Nigeria from 3 February 1976 to July 1978 during the military regime of General Olusegun Obasanjo, after Benue State had been split from the old Benue-Plateau State.

Background and education
Abdullahi Shelleng was born on 20 January 1942 in Shelleng, in the Numan Local Government Area of the former Gongola State (now Adamawa State). He was educated in Shelleng and Yola, and attended the Government College, Zaria (1957–1961). He joined the Army in 1962 and attended the Nigerian Defence Academy, Kaduna (April 1962 – August 1962), and then the Pakistan Military Academy, Kakul (1962–1965).

Military career

He was commissioned 2nd Lieutenant in April 1965. He served as a Company Commander during the Nigerian Civil War. 
He attended Command and General Staff College, Fort Leavenworth, Kansas, USA (1973–1974), and then was appointed Colonel, General Staff in Hq. 2nd Infantry Division, Nigerian Army, Ibadan (1974–1975).
He was one of the participants in the July 1975 coup against General Yakubu Gowon, monitoring the situation from the 2nd Division HQ at Ibadan.
Following the coup, he became a Principal Staff Officer, Supreme Headquarters, Lagos (1975–1976).

Governor of Benue State

General Murtala Mohammed appointed Abdullahi Shelleng as Military Governor of Benue State on 3 February 1976, a post he held until July 1978.
Shellung had the difficult job of creating a functioning state machinery with an ethnically mixed and politically dissatisfied population. He built accommodation for civil servants and established schools and colleges, including the Murtala College of Arts, Science and Technology. He also initiated Benue Brewery at Makurdi, Idah Sanitary Ware Industry at Idah, and the Burnt Brick Industry at Otukpo. However, he failed to repair the untarred roads in the state. In many cases he opened establishments on temporary sites, thus storing up problems for the future. He was also criticized for destroying the mini Makurdi Stadium.

Later career

After retiring from the army, Abdullahi Shelleng became one of the leaders of the umbrella union of the North, the Arewa Consultative Forum.
In October 2005, he was one of the Adamawa State delegates at the National Convention of the People's Democratic Party (PDP).
In April 2006 he was one of a group of Adamawa State PDP members who announced they had suspended Vice President Atiku Abubakar the state governor Boni Haruna.

References

1942 births
Living people
Governors of Benue State
People from Adamawa State
Nigerian Muslims
Nigerian Army officers
Nigerian Defence Academy alumni
Military personnel of the Nigerian Civil War
Nigerian Defence Academy Commandants